Broadway Media is a radio and digital media company based in Salt Lake City, Utah, United States.

Broadway Media was founded by Former Real Salt Lake owner Dell Loy Hansen. Stephen Johnson was named CEO/GM of Broadway Media in 2014, and former Simmons Media CEO/GM G. Craig Hansen retired at the same time.

Radio stations 
 KXRK 96.3FM Alternative rock, better known as "X96", Simulcast on 95.9 K240EP (Provo)
 KXRK-HD2 - Classic Alternative (X96 Classic HD2) Exclusive and online
 KUUU 92.5 FM Classic Hip Hop-leaning Rhythmic AC, known as "92.5 The Beat", Simulcast on 94.5 K233DI (Provo)
 KUDD 105.1 FM CHR better known as "MIX 105.1", Simulcast on 103.9 K280GJ (Provo)
 KUDD-HD2 Oldies (105.1 HD2 KOOL FM) Exclusive and online 
 KEGA 101.5 FM Country better known as "101.5 The Eagle"
 KYMV 100.7 FM Adult Hits better known as "100.7 BOB FM", Simulcast on 105.5 FM K288GY (Tooele)
 KALL 700 AM Sports talk better known as "ESPN 700" , Simulcast on 92.1 K221GK (Salt Lake City)
 KOVO 960 AM Sports talk better known as "ESPN 960"

References

External links
 Broadway Media
 All Access
 Salt Lake Tribune
 Radio Insight

Radio broadcasting companies of the United States